The 2023 TCU Horned Frogs football team will represent Texas Christian University (TCU) in the Big 12 Conference during the 2023 NCAA Division I FBS football season. The Horned Frogs are expected to be led by Sonny Dykes in his second season as their head coach. 

The Horned Frogs play their home games at Amon G. Carter Stadium in Fort Worth, Texas.

Previous season

The Horned Frogs finished the 2022 season with a 12–1 record and advanced to the College Football Playoff semifinals. They faced Michigan in the Fiesta Bowl, where they defeated them as 7.5 point underdogs, 51-45, to advance to the 2023 College Football Playoff National Championship, where they were blown out by the Georgia Bulldogs 7-65.

Schedule

References

TCU
TCU Horned Frogs football seasons
TCU Horned Frogs football